Taleb may refer to:

People

Surname
 Loay Taleb (born 1975), Syrian footballer
 Nassim Nicholas Taleb (born 1960), Lebanese-American writer and statistician
 Nordine Taleb (born 1981), French mixed martial artist 
 Oday Taleb (born 1977), Iraqi football goalkeeper

Given name
 Taleb Alrefai (born 1958), Kuwaiti journalist and writer
 Taleb Nematpour (born 1984), Iranian wrestler
 Taleb Tawatha (born 1992), Israeli-Bedouin footballer

Places
 Taleb, Iran, a village in East Azerbaijan Province, Iran
 Taleb, Khuzestan, a village in Khuzestan Province, Iran

See also
 Taleb distribution, a type of returns profile
 Talib (disambiguation)